Janne Tuven (born 25 October 1975) is a Norwegian team handball player.

She played for the clubs Vestby HK, Nordstrand IF and Stabæk IF. She also spent time on loan at Ikast. For the Norway women's national handball team. She received silver medals at the World Women's Handball Championship in 1997 and in 2001, and became European champion in 1998.

Tuven made her debut on the national team in 1994. She played 108 matches and scored 268 goals for the national team. She struggled with injury problems through much of her career.

She has a relationship with retired footballer Christian Holter. They live in Sandvika.

References

External links

1975 births
Living people
Norwegian female handball players
People from Akershus
Sportspeople from Bærum